The Gabriela Women's Party (General Assembly Binding Women for Reform, Integrity, Equality, Leadership and Action) or simply GABRIELA, is a progressive Filipino political party that advocates for women's issues and represents Filipino women in the House of Representatives.

The party is separate, although allied, with GABRIELA National Alliance of Filipino Women. GABRIELA, the alliance, is a nationwide network of grassroots organizations, institutions, and programs that address social issues such as human rights, poverty, globalization, militarism, violence, rape culture, health, sex trafficking, censorship and other issues affecting women. The alliance has regional chapters in Metro Manila, Cordillera Administrative Region, and Mindanao; sub-regional chapters in Negros, Panay and Samar, and provincial chapters in Bicol and Cebu. GABRIELA's membership includes Filipino women from marginalized sectors of society and works towards their education and empowerment. The organization also engages in counseling services, medical missions, free clinics, and trainings on women's health and women's rights.

History 
GABRIELA, the alliance, was founded in April 1984 after 10,000 women marched in Manila, defying a Marcos decree against demonstrations. GABRIELA was named in honor of Gabriela Silang, a Filipina revolutionary, who led a revolt against Spain in 1763 following her husband's assassination. Amidst a backdrop of widespread social inequality and unrest, GABRIELA aimed to synthesize issues of national liberation, poverty and women's emancipation. The organization's founders pushed for "Third World feminism" which focused on comprehensive social transformation, rather than focusing on individual forms of oppression. GABRIELA's advocacy challenges patriarchy, alongside resisting foreign influence and neocolonialism.

Electoral performance 
In 2003, the Gabriela Women's Party was launched with the help of GABRIELA members and other women's and people's organizations. In the 2004 election for the House of Representatives the party-list received 464,586 votes (3.6518% of the nationwide vote) and won a seat for first nominee Liza Maza In the 2007 election, the party won two seats in the nationwide party-list vote. The Gabriela Women's Party was the only women's party to obtain a second term in Congress.

Representatives to Congress 
13th Congress (2004–2007) - Liza Maza
14th Congress (2007–2010) - Luzviminda Ilagan, Liza Maza
15th Congress (2010–2013) - Luzviminda Ilagan, Emerenciana de Jesus
16th Congress (2013–2016) - Luzviminda Ilagan, Emerenciana de Jesus
17th Congress (2016–2019) - Emerenciana de Jesus, Arlene Brosas
18th Congress (2019–2022) - Arlene Brosas
19th Congress (2022–present) - Arlene Brosas

Programs and positions

One Billion Rising (OBR) Task Force Philippines
One Billion Rising (OBR) is a global campaign founded to end rape and sexual violence against women. Since 2013, GABRIELA have led the One Billion Rising Task Force in the Philippines and abroad where its chapters are situated.

The Philippine task force members include:

 Gabriela
 Gabriela Women's Party
 Gabriela Youth
 Kilusang Mayo Uno
 Alliance of Concerned Teachers
 Ecumenical Women's Forum
 Salinlahi Alliance for Children's Concerns
 Association for the Rights of Children in Southeast Asia
 Amihan Federation of Peasant Women
 Kadamay 
 Innabuyog Gabriela
 Kabataan Partylist
 Migrante

Human trafficking 
In the Philippines, GABRIELA is actively involved in awareness campaigns to prevent the trafficking of women and girls from the Philippines. Its strategies consist of seminars and information dissemination to NGOs and government agencies and awareness campaigns at the community level. In 1999, GABRIELA launched the Purple Rose Campaign against the sex trafficking of Filipino women and children.  The campaign achieved a milestone with the passage of the Anti-Trafficking in Persons Act of 2003 with GABRIELA representative Liza Maza as the bill's co-sponsor. GABRIELA is also actively involved in the Vow to Fight Against Violence on Women and the Free Our Sisters/Free Ourselves campaign.

International chapters

GABRIELA has chapters in the United States, the Netherlands, Japan, Hong Kong, Taiwan, Italy, Germany and the United Kingdom.

See also 
Violeta Marasigan

References

External links
GABRIELA Alliance official website
Gabriela Women's Party official website
GABRIELA USA

1984 establishments in the Philippines
Anti-pornography feminism
Anti-pornography movements
Democratic socialist parties in Asia
Feminist organizations in the Philippines
Feminist parties in Asia
Human trafficking in the Philippines
International League of Peoples' Struggle
Left-wing parties in the Philippines
Left-wing politics in the Philippines
National Democracy Movement (Philippines)
Organizations established in 1984
Political parties established in 2003
Organizations that combat human trafficking
Party-lists represented in the House of Representatives of the Philippines
Socialist feminist organizations
Socialist parties in the Philippines